Robon is a clone of Berzerk for the ZX Spectrum written by Andrew Beale and released by Softek in 1983. The game's documentation refers to it as a "version of the popular arcade game."

Reception
Crash magazine said, "This Frenzy / Berserk game, unlike most of Softek’s other programs, is not very good. At the slowest of the nine skill levels it’s a bit boring, and at the fastest it’s quite meaningless. The usual format is followed; electrified walls, robots, unkillable ‘Raboks’ which leave exploding mines behind".

See also
Robot Attack
K-Razy Shoot-Out
Thief

References

External links 
 
 

1983 video games
Multidirectional shooters
Video games developed in the United Kingdom
ZX Spectrum games
ZX Spectrum-only games
Video game clones